Lucinda Whitty (born 9 November 1989) is an Australian sailor. She represented Australia at the 2012 Summer Olympics in sailing.

Personal
Nicknamed Lu, Whitty was born on 9 November 1989 in Sydney. Jeremy Whitty is her father and has competed in several sailing races. She has siblings and they are active in competitive sailing. She attended Lane Cove Public School before going to high school at SCEGGS Darlinghurst.  She enrolled at the University of Technology, Sydney in 2008 and is enrolled as of 2012.  She is working on a Bachelor of Business. , she lives in Sydney.

Sailing
Whitty is a sailor, acting as a bowman. As a five-year-old, she started participating in the sport. The boat she competes in is Only Racing and is operated by teammate Olivia Price.  Her primary training base is Sydney, with a secondary training base in Weymouth. She is a member of the Middle Harbour Yacht Club. She has a sailing scholarship from the Australian Institute of Sport and New South Wales Institute of Sport.

Whitty made her Australian national team debut at the 2007 Youth Olympic Festival. At the 2009 ISAF Women's Match Racing Championship, she came in first. She competed in the 2009 ISAF Match Racing World Championships with  Nicky Souter, and came away with a first-place finish. In 2010, she was named the Australian Female of the Year Sailor.  The same year, she earned the title of Australian University Female Sportswoman of the year and the 2010 Female Sailor of the Year.

In 2011, Whitty, Nina Curtis and Olivia Price formed their Elliott 6m team in response to an announcement that the class of boat would be an Olympic event in London. She competed in the Perth 2011 ISAF Sailing World Championships.  Her team finished eighth. At ISAF Nations Cup Grand Final in Sheboygan, her team finished third in match racing. At the 2011 Weymouth & Portland International Regatta  in Weymouth, Great Britain, her team finished fifth in match racing. At the 2011 European Championships in Helsinki, Finland, her team finished seventh in match racing. At the 2012 ISAF Sailing World Cup in Weymouth, her team finished first. At the 2012 ISAF Sailing World Cup in Miami, her team finished second. At the 2012 ISAF Sailing World Cup in Spain, her team finished third. She competed in the 2012 ISAF Women's Match Racing World Championship in Gottenburg, Sweden.  Going into the event, her team was ranked sixth in the world.  With five wins and two losses, her team finished third in their group in the group stage. This was her team's final competition before the Olympics.

Whitty was selected to represent Australia at the 2012 Summer Olympics in sailing.  She was named to the Elliott 6m team in June 2012. In the lead up to the Olympic Games, she participated at a national team training camp at the Australian Institute of Sport's Italian training centre. In the 2012 games, Whitty, Curtis and Price got a silver medal for Australia.

References

External links
 

Living people
1989 births
Sportswomen from New South Wales
Australian Institute of Sport sailors
Sailors at the 2012 Summer Olympics – Elliott 6m
Olympic sailors of Australia
Australian female sailors (sport)
Olympic silver medalists for Australia
Olympic medalists in sailing
New South Wales Institute of Sport alumni
Medalists at the 2012 Summer Olympics
Sailors from Sydney
21st-century Australian women